Susanne Marguerite Humphrey (c. 1944–January 8, 2019) was an American medical librarian who worked at the National Library of Medicine.

Career 
Humphrey worked at the National Library of Medicine for 43 years before retiring in 2009. Humphrey wrote the textbook, Databases a Primer for Retrieving Information by Computer in the mid-1980s. At the National Library of Medicine, Humphrey led a project to automatically index journal articles according to Medical Subject Headings, and her research led to the development of public, web-based tools for automated indexing.

Personal life 
Humphrey's husband was Andrew Clifton Humphrey Sr. She died in January 2019 aged 74.

Awards and honors 
Humphrey earned the 1988 Best JASIS Paper award with co-author Nancy E. Miller for their paper "Knowledge-Based Indexing of the Medical Literature: The Indexing Aid Project". In 1994, Humphrey was elected a AAAS Fellow.

References 

2019 deaths
American librarians
American women librarians
Information scientists
Year of birth uncertain
21st-century American women